The 2027 World Women's Handball Championship, the 28th event hosted by the International Handball Federation, will take place in Hungary in 2027. It will be the main qualifying event for the women's handball tournament of the 2028 Summer Olympics.

Venues
The bid includes the following four host cities/venues:

Qualification 

1. To bear in mind the 2028 Summer Olympics, the IHF Council awarded the United States with wild cards for the 2025 and 2027 World Championships.

2. If countries from Oceania (Australia or New Zealand) participating in the Asian Championships finish within the top 5, they will qualify for the World Championships. If either finishes sixth or lower, the place would have been transferred to the wild card spot.

Qualified teams

References

World Handball Championship tournaments
International handball competitions hosted by Hungary
International sports competitions in Budapest
Sport in Debrecen
Sport in Győr
World Women's Hand
World Women's